The France women's national rugby union team represents France in women's international rugby union. They played their first international in 1982 against the Netherlands.

History
Source: "Des Filles en Ovalie", Éditions Atlantica (2005), Written by Jacques Corte / Yaneth Pinilla B. Foreword by Serge Betsen.

There are records of women's rugby being played in France as early as the mid-1890s, and in the 1920s a form of the game called "barette" was very popular, with national championships. However, after the 1930s the game had all but disappeared and was not revived until 1965 when groups of students in Lyon and Toulouse decided to take part in the great charitable campaign against world hunger. Most of them had brothers and friends who played rugby, so they decided to organise a charity game at Bourg-en-Bresse.

So successful was this that a regular series of games began, with clubs being formed as students graduated, initially mainly in the south. In 1969 a national association – the ARF [Women's Rugby Association] – was formed. Despite initial opposition to the game from both the government and the FFR (who briefly banned any FFR officials from officiating at women's games) by 1976 12 clubs were taking part in national competitions.

In 1982, by which time the number of clubs had more than doubled, the ARF signed a memorandum of understanding was agreed with the FFR which finally gave their official backing – and in the same year France took part in the first ever women's rugby international.

Current squad
France named their final 32-player squad on the 11 September 2022, for the 2021 Rugby World Cup.

Previous squads

Record
Note: Although the FFR list all of the following as full internationals or "test matches" in their publications (including their website), they do not award caps for all of the games. In particular, no caps have been officially awarded for appearances before 1989 (when the FFR became responsible for women's rugby), and most matches in FIRA tournaments after 2004 are uncapped. As a result, there can be a significant difference between the number of appearances players may have made for France and their official number of caps.

Overall 

(Full internationals only)Correct as of 21 November 2021

World Cup

Notable players
Nathalie Amiel was inducted into the IRB Hall of Fame on 17 November 2014. She made her international debut at 15 against Great Britain in London in 1986. She went on to win 56 caps for France by the time she retired in 2002. She played at three Women’s Rugby World Cups in 1991, 1994 and 2002.

See also
 Rugby union in France
 France national rugby union team (men's team)

References

External links
  Official website of the Fédération Française de Rugby
 News on Planet-Rugby.com
 France on IRB.com

 
European national women's rugby union teams
national